Lynn J. Archibald (September 27, 1944 – May 28, 1997) was an American college basketball coach.  He served as head basketball coach at Idaho State University and the University of Utah.

Born in Logan, Utah, Archibald moved to Oregon and California with his family and graduated from Torrance High School in Torrance, California. He played college basketball at Utah State in Logan as a freshman and at El Camino College as a sophomore; he completed his bachelor's degree at Fresno State.

When Jerry Pimm departed for UC Santa Barbara, Archibald was promoted and led the Utes for six years  with a  

Succeeded by Rick Majerus at Utah, Archibald was an assistant at Arizona State University  then at Brigham Young University in Provo, Utah, and later, the director of basketball operations. After a long battle with prostate cancer, Archibald died at his Provo home at age 52 

While at Idaho State in 1979, Archibald mused that the peculiar King Spud Trophy for the intrastate series with Idaho should be awarded to the loser: "It's the ugliest thing I've ever seen. The only good thing that happened last week was losing it."

His son Beau, who played college basketball at Washington State, and later at Connecticut, is also a basketball coach.

Head coaching record

References

External links
Coaching record @ Sports-Reference.com

1944 births
1997 deaths
American men's basketball players
Arizona State Sun Devils men's basketball coaches
Basketball coaches from Utah
Basketball players from Utah
BYU Cougars men's basketball coaches
Cal Poly Mustangs men's basketball coaches
College men's basketball head coaches in the United States
Idaho State Bengals men's basketball coaches
Junior college men's basketball players in the United States
Long Beach State Beach men's basketball coaches
Sportspeople from Logan, Utah
UNLV Runnin' Rebels basketball coaches
USC Trojans men's basketball coaches
Utah Utes men's basketball coaches